Herminio Díaz Zabala (born 12 December 1964) is a Spanish former professional racing cyclist. He rode in nine editions of the Tour de France, one edition of the Giro d'Italia and nine editions of the Vuelta a España.

Major results
1989
1st Stage 9 Vuelta a España
1991
1st Overall Tirreno–Adriatico

References

External links
 

1964 births
Living people
Spanish male cyclists
People from the Besaya Valley
Cyclists from Cantabria